State Route 133 (SR-133) is a highway completely within Millard County in central Utah that connects Interstate 15 (I-15) to Kanosh while passing through Meadow. The route serves as both communities' Main Street in its seven-mile (11 km) span.

Route description
From the southern terminus at the southern city limits of Kanosh, the route runs north as a two-lane undivided highway through the town before turning northeast. It continues this direction until reaching Meadow, where it turns north again. It maintains this direction until its northern terminus with I-15.

History
When this designation was formed in 1933, the route ran from SR-2, now Interstate 80, in Coalville to the Wyoming border via Pine View. This route was deleted in 1969.

The current route of SR-133 was formed in the same year the old route was deleted, 1969. When it was first formed, it made a partial loop around SR-1 (I-15). In 1975 the portion of the highway from the southern terminus of I-15 to the southern Kanosh city limits was deleted, forming the current route.

Major intersections

See also

 List of state highways in Utah

References

External links
 

133
Utah State Route 133
 133